Budya Varyash (Budya Wäräş) is a rural locality (a village) in Starovaryashsky Selsoviet, Yanaulsky District, Bashkortostan, Russia. The population was 166 as of 2010. There are 3 streets.

Geography 
Budya Varyash is located 41 km southeast of Yanaul (the district's administrative centre) by road. Stary Varyash is the nearest rural locality.

References 

Rural localities in Yanaulsky District